Pedleya acanthoclada, commonly known as thorny pea, is the only species of flowering plant in the genus Pedleya of the family Fabaceae. It is a small shrub with pink or purplish flowers, and leaves in groups of three.

Description

Taxonomy and naming
Pedleya acanthoclada was first formally described in 1861 by Ferdinand von Mueller, who gave it the name Desmodium acanthocladum in his Fragmenta Phytographiae Australiae, from specimens collected near the Clarence River by Hermann Beckler. In 2018 Hiroyoshi Ohashi and Kazuaki Ohashi transferred the species to Pedleya in the Journal of Japanese Botany. The genus name honours Leslie Pedley and the specific epithet (acanthoclada) means "spiny shoot".

Distribution and habitat
Thorny pea is found growing mostly near rivers in the Lismore and Grafton regions of New South Wales.

Conservation status
This species of pea (as Desmodium acanthocladum) is listed as "vulnerable" under the Australian Government Environment Protection and Biodiversity Conservation Act 1999 and the New South Wales Government Biodiversity Conservation Act 2016. The main threats to the species include habitat fragmentation, damage cause by roadworks, trampling by livestock and weed infestation.

References

Desmodieae
Flora of New South Wales
Plants described in 1861
Taxa named by Ferdinand von Mueller